Empis nuntia is a species of fly in the family Empididae. It is included in the subgenus Empis. It is found in the  Palearctic.

References

External links
Images representing Empis at BOLD

Empis
Insects described in 1838
Asilomorph flies of Europe